Aq Mashhad-e Kamar Kheyl (also Romanized as Āq Mashhad-e Kamar Kheyl; also known as Kamar Kheyl) is a village in Tangeh Soleyman Rural District, Kolijan Rostaq District, Sari County, Mazandaran Province, Iran. At the 2006 census, its population was 175, in 52 families.

References 

Populated places in Sari County